National Highway 703B, commonly referred to as NH 703B is a national highway in India. It is a secondary route of National Highway 3 in the state of Punjab in India.

Route 
Moga - Kot Ise Khan - Makhu - Harike - Bhikhiwind - Khalra.

Junctions  

   in Moga
   near Makhu
   in Makhu
   in Harike
   in Bhikhiwind

See also 

 List of National Highways in India
 List of National Highways in India by state

References

External links 
 NH 703B on OpenStreetMap

National highways in India
National Highways in Punjab, India